Wanjiku Kabira (born 15 November 1948) is an associate professor of literature at the University of Nairobi, Kenya. She has specialized in the fields of Oral literature, African-American literature and Caribbean literature. She has been actively involved in women affairs and in gender issues. Wanjiku has served as in various capacities notably as 
a. Vice-Chair in the Kenya Constitutional Review Process (2000–2005)
b. Chair Person Women Political Alliance (2002–2011)
c. Director Collaborative Center for Gender and Development (1995–2009)
d. Chair, Department of Literature, University of Nairobi

Early life and education
Prof. Wanjiku Kabira was born in 1948 in the present Lari Constituency. She went to school at Githirioni Primary School and later at Loreto High School, Limuru and Loreto Convent Msongari for her advanced certificate ("A" levels).  She studied Literature, History and Scripture and received the "Best Performing Student" prize in Literature.

Work
Kabira is a published author of young adult books. She has published widely on literature, women and on gender issues. One of her most notable books is A Letter to Mariama Ba, which was a response to So Long a Letter, a book written by Mariama Bâ.
Her work with women saw the founding of the African Women Studies Centre at the University of Nairobi in June, 2011. She became the Director of the Centre in 2014 and still serves in that capacity. In her work with the Constitution of Kenya Review Commission she wrote a book, A Time for Harvest, which traces the women's journey in the struggle for a new constitution in the past 20 years, beginning from 1992 to 2012. She reminds the 16 women MPs of 290 that their mere presence in Parliament will be fruitless if it is not properly utilised. Other books she has also published are Our Mother's Footsteps, Reclaiming My Dreams: Stories of Wanjiriwa Rukena and The Beaten Track and other personal stories: A collection of short stories.

Other published credits of Wanjiku Mukabi Kabira include Agikuyu (Heritage Library of African Peoples East Africa). Professor Kabira also has written many books about women and gender issues, among them: Our Secret Lives; They Have Destroyed the Temple; Celebrating Women's Resistance; The Oral Artist.

References

External links

 University of Nairobi Staff database

1945 births
Living people
People from Kiambu County
Kenyan writers
Kenyan women writers
Academic staff of the University of Nairobi